Fury, published in 2001, is the seventh novel by author Salman Rushdie. Rushdie depicts contemporary New York City as the epicenter of globalization and all of its tragic flaws.

Plot summary

Malik Solanka, a Cambridge-educated millionaire from Bombay, is looking for an escape from himself. At first he escapes from his academic life by immersing himself into a world of miniatures (after becoming enamored with the miniature houses on display at the Rijksmuseum Amsterdam), eventually creating a puppet called "Little Brain" and leaving the academy for television.

However, dissatisfaction with the rising popularity of "Little Brain" serves to ignite deeper demons within Solanka's life, resulting in the narrowly avoided murder of his wife and child.  To further escape, Solanka travels to New York, hopeful he can lose himself and his demons in America, only to find that he is forced to confront himself.

Further reading

Brouillette, Sarah. ‘Authorship as crisis in Salman Rushdie’s Fury’, Sage Publications, (2005)
Eder, Richard. “The Beast in Me: Review of Fury by Salman Rushdie” New York Times, (2001). 
Gonzalez, Madelena. "United States of Banana (2011), Elizabeth Costello (2003) and Fury (2001): Portrait of the Writer as the ‘Bad Subject’of Globalisation." Études britanniques contemporaines. Revue de la Société dʼétudes anglaises contemporaines 46 (2014). 
Zucker, David J. "Fury Meets and Greets Sabbath's Theater: Salman Rushdie's Homage to Philip Roth." Philip Roth Studies 9, no. 2 (2013): 85-90.
Zimring, Rishona. "The passionate cosmopolitan in Salman Rushdie's Fury."Journal of Postcolonial Writing 46, no. 1 (2010): 5-16.

References

Novels by Salman Rushdie
2001 British novels
Jonathan Cape books
Novels set in Mumbai
Novels set in New York City
Indian diaspora in fiction
Indian-American novels